Shache Airport  is an airport that serves Yarkant County (Shache) in Kashgar Prefecture of Xinjiang Uyghur Autonomous Region in northwestern China. It is located near Zirefuxiati Village of Zirefuxiati Tajik Township. The airport received approval from the State Council of China and the Central Military Commission in January 2014. The estimated cost of construction was 541 million yuan. Shache Airport opened on 1 August 2017 as the 19th airport in Xinjiang.

Facilities
Carnoc reported in 2014 that the airport would have a 3,000-meter runway (class 4C), a 3,000 square-meter terminal building, and four aircraft parking places. It is projected to handle 200,000 passengers and 830 tons of cargo annually by 2020.

Airlines and destinations

See also
List of airports in China
List of the busiest airports in China

References

Airports in Xinjiang
Airports established in 2017
Kashgar Prefecture
2017 establishments in China